Paul Joseph Jean Poupard (born 30 August 1930) is a French prelate of the Catholic Church who has been a Cardinal since 1985. He held positions in the Roman Curia for more than 25 years, serving as President of the Pontifical Council for Culture from 1988 to 2007 and briefly as President of the Pontifical Council for Interreligious Dialogue.

Biography
Poupard was born in Bouzillé, Maine-et-Loire. He studied at the minor seminary in Beaupréau, University of Angers, and École Pratique des Hautes Études of the Sorbonne (from where he obtained his doctorates in theology and history). Poupard was ordained to the priesthood by Bishop Stanislas Courbe on 18 December 1954, and then taught at the Mongazon School. After entering the French section of the Secretariat of State in 1959, he was raised to the rank of Chaplain of His Holiness on 20 March 1965, and of Honorary Prelate of His Holiness on 29 November 1971. Poupard was Rector of the Institut Catholique de Paris from 1972 to 1980, and also served as vice-president of the Society of French Ecclesiastical History.

On 2 February 1979, he was appointed Auxiliary Bishop of Paris and Titular Bishop of Usula. Poupard received his episcopal consecration on the following 6 April from Cardinal François Marty, with Archbishop André Pailler and Bishop Jean Orchampt serving as co-consecrators, in the Church of Saint-Germain-des-Prés. A year and a half later, in 1980, he received a position in the Roman Curia, the Holy See's governing body, as Pro-President of the Secretariat for Non-Believers, later (in 1988) renamed the Pontifical Council for Culture. In 1985, his title was changed to president, on his becoming Cardinal-Deacon of S. Eugenio. After the sede vacante period that followed the death of Pope John Paul II, Pope Benedict XVI reappointed him to the same position and, on 11 March 2006, also named him President of the Pontifical Council for Interreligious Dialogue.

Some of his writings have been translated into languages including Arabic, Bulgarian, Chinese, Croatian, English, German, Hungarian, Italian, Japanese, Korean, Portuguese, Russian, and Spanish. He holds doctorates in theology and history from the Sorbonne, as well as honorary doctorates from the Universities of Aix-en-Provence, Fu Jen, Louvain, Kyoto, Santiago de Chile, Puebla de los Angeles and the Babes-Bolyai University/Cluj-Napoca.

In 1996 he was appointed Cardinal-Priest of Santa Prassede. He was one of the cardinal electors who participated in the 2005 papal conclave that elected Pope Benedict XVI. In September 2007 Pope Benedict replaced him as President of the Pontifical Council for Interreligious Dialogue with Cardinal Jean-Louis Tauran and as President of the Pontifical Council for Culture with Gianfranco Ravasi.

Bibliography
 ''John XXIII. Simple and Humble, A Blessed Man", 'The Holiness of John XXIII' by His Eminence Paul Cardinal Poupard, President Emeritus of the Pontifical Council for Culture, p. 25 – p. 57, Gunnar Riebs, ST Pauls, 2011,

References

External links
 
Bio
Speech – 27 June 2001 (Archived: 8 February 2007)
Pontifical Council for Culture (Dicastery presided over by Cardinal Poupard)

1930 births
Living people
People from Maine-et-Loire
20th-century French cardinals
University of Paris alumni
Pontifical Council for Interreligious Dialogue
Pontifical Council for Culture
Cardinals created by Pope John Paul II
Members of the Pontifical Council for Culture
Auxiliary bishops of Paris
21st-century French cardinals